Fyodor Vasilevich Shutkov (15 February 1924 – 18 December 2001) was a Russian sailor who competed for the Soviet Union in the Summer Olympics of 1952, 1956, 1960, 1964, and 1968.

He first competed in the 1952 6-metre class competition, as crew member of the Soviet boat Circe which finished eleventh. His subsequent Olympic competition was in the Star class as crew member, each time with Timir Pinegin as skipper.
 1956 results, finished eighth in the Soviet boat Tulilind.
 1960 results, Gold Medal in the Soviet boat Tornado.
 1964 results, finished fifth in the Soviet boat Taifun.
 1968 results, finished 16th in the Soviet boat.

References
Biography of Fyodor Shutkov 

1924 births
2001 deaths
Russian male sailors (sport)
Soviet male sailors (sport)
Olympic sailors of the Soviet Union
Sailors at the 1952 Summer Olympics – 6 Metre
Sailors at the 1956 Summer Olympics – Star
Sailors at the 1960 Summer Olympics – Star
Sailors at the 1964 Summer Olympics – Star
Sailors at the 1968 Summer Olympics – Star
Olympic gold medalists for the Soviet Union
Olympic medalists in sailing
Medalists at the 1960 Summer Olympics